Mark White (born 14 April 1998) is an Irish Gaelic footballer. A member of the Clonakilty club, he currently plays as a goalkeeper with the Cork senior team.

References

1998 births
Living people
Clonakilty Gaelic footballers
Clonakilty hurlers
Cork inter-county Gaelic footballers
Gaelic football goalkeepers